Once railway station (informally known as ) is a large railway terminus in central Buenos Aires, Argentina, in the barrio of Balvanera.

The station, inaugurated on 20 December 1882, is located in the barrio of Balvanera, immediately north of Plaza Miserere, a large public square. The current terminal, designed by the Dutch architect John Doyer in Renaissance Revival style, was built in two stages, from 1895 to 1898, and then from 1906 to 1907.

The station is named after the 11 September 1852 rebellion of Buenos Aires against the federal government of Justo José de Urquiza. Contrary to popular belief, the station is not named after the death of the president Domingo Faustino Sarmiento on 11 September 1888.

History

Background and first buildings

In 1853, a group of entrepreneurs from the upper class of Buenos Aires formed the Society of the Iron Road from Buenos Aires to the West, which would lead to the construction of the first railway line in Argentina. The original eastern terminus of the Buenos Aires Western Railway was the Del Parque railway station (located where currently Plaza Lavalle is located), with the first intermediate stop on the railway line heading west being named "Once de Septiembre". As a consequence, that first Once de Septiembre station was a modest building made of wood and placed on Bartolomé Mitre street. It had only one platform and some warehouses to store wood and other materials. 

In 1873, the Government considered moving the terminus of the railway line from Del Parque to Once station as a consequence of the increasing growth of Buenos Aires and in the area between both stations due to mass immigration to Argentina. The continuous expansion of Buenos Aires produced a growth of road traffic with a large number of trams and carriages, and the rail tracks crossed along streets and avenues (such as Corrientes) with high vehicle and pedestrians traffic. In April 1878, the Municipality of Buenos Aires thus promulgated by decree the closing of the Once–Del Parque section of the railway line, as well as the moving of the terminal station to Once, though it did not take effect until 1883. A new station building was built for that purpose, an unassuming clapboard structure, which was inaugurated on 1 January 1883. Like the previous station, the building was made of wood, but nonetheless bigger than the previous one.

By the 1890s new groups of immigrants established near Once station.

Current station building 

The original terminal was ordered to be replaced by larger facilities following its 1890 purchase by the Buenos Aires Western Railway. Designed by the Dutch architect John Doyer, the new Renaissance Revival terminal was built in two stages, from 1895 to 1898, and then from 1906 to 1907; refurbishment works completed in 1972 removed most of the terminal's ornate, cast-iron roof trusses (though these are still visible in the adjoining subway station).

In 1913, Once station was the first railway terminal in Buenos Aires to be connected to the Buenos Aires Underground network, as the first underground line in the city was opened, the current Line A of the Subterráneo de Buenos Aires between Plaza de Mayo and Plaza Once.

Rail accidents

On 22 February 2012, a commuter train entered Once station traveling at an excessive speed, about 26 km/h, and crashed into the buffers at the end of the line, killing 51 people and injuring at least 703.

A similar, though less severe, incident took place on the morning of 19 October 2013, when a commuter train crashed into the buffers and landed on the platform above. Passengers reported that the conductor was speeding from Caballito Station (the previous stop); a crowd of passengers surrounded the control booth following the crash yelling "murderer", though the conductor had already fled. The conductor, Julio Benítez, was arrested after he was found with the train event recorder hidden in his backpack; Benítez had attempted to destroy the device.

Services

Estación Once handles both long-distance and local passenger trains. The publicly owned provincial railway company Ferrobaires operates trains over four principal rail lines which fan out west over the surrounding Buenos Aires Province. Destinations include Pehuajó, Bragado, Bahia Blanca and points between.

Additionally, the commuter rail State-owned company Trenes Argentinos S.E. operates a regular train service to the suburbs of Buenos Aires along the branches of its Sarmiento Line to destinations including Moreno, Luján, Lobos, and Mercedes. The station is accessible by numerous public bus services and by the A line of the Buenos Aires Underground via its "Plaza Miserere" station. Estación Once underwent extensive renovations prior to 2007, when the new H line of the metro reached the heavily transited terminal.

Gallery

See also

 Balvanera
 Del Parque railway station

References

External links

 

Balvanera
Railway stations in Buenos Aires
Renaissance Revival architecture in Argentina
Railway stations opened in 1907